Judson Michael Procyk (April 9, 1931 – April 24, 2001) was the third Metropolitan Archbishop of the Byzantine Catholic Metropolitan Church of Pittsburgh, the American branch of the Ruthenian Greek Catholic Church.

Career

Judson Procyk was appointed Archbishop of the Byzantine Catholic Archeparchy of Pittsburgh on November 9, 1994, and ordained a bishop on February 7, 1995.

External links
His Excellency Metropolitan Judson Procyk, D.D. - The Carpathian Connection
 Judson Procyk information page at Catholic-Hierarchy.org
 The Byzantine Catholic Archeparchy of Pittsburgh
 Byzantine Catholic Church in America

References

1931 births
2001 deaths
American Eastern Catholic bishops
20th-century Eastern Catholic bishops
21st-century Eastern Catholic bishops
Religious leaders from Pittsburgh
Ruthenian Catholic bishops
20th-century American clergy
21st-century American clergy